Dr Herbert Loebl,  (18 April 192328 January 2013) was a British businessman, philanthropist and leading proponent of exporting, notable as a co-founder of Joyce, Loebl & Company, a manufacturer of scientific instruments.

Early life
Herbert Loebl was born in Bamberg in Germany, into a prominent local Jewish family. With the rise of the Nazi party in Germany, the Loebl family fled persecution to the United Kingdom in late 1938 where he attended Dover Grammar School for Boys in Kent.  He studied electrical engineering at King’s College, Newcastle where he graduated in 1949.

Joyce, Loebl & Company Ltd
During his time at King's College, Loebl met Captain Robert Joyce. In 1951, the two went into business producing scientific equipment with only £200 of capital. Joyce, Loebl & Co. exported over 70 percent of its products and at the time of its sale to Technical Operations Inc. (Tech/Ops), an American company, it was one of the major employers in north-eastern England with some 500 workers. It is estimated that the company also spawned 45 other businesses in the region. Some of the most significant products developed by Joyce, Loebl & Co were the optical microdensitometer used to visualise the properties of DNA and other organic compounds, and the MecoLab, a system of routine blood-panel analysis for hospitals.

There are currently four companies which have grown out of the original Joyce, Loebl & Company Ltd: Loebl Ltd, Sevcon Ltd, Applied Imaging Ltd, and Phasor Ltd.

Philanthropy
A donation made by Hebert Loebl was used to set up a section of the business school of Newcastle University, focussed on the promotion of exports, which is named the Herbert Loebl Export Academy in his honour.

Awards
Loebl was awarded the Order of the British Empire in 1973 for services to exports. He was also awarded the Citizen's Medal of the city of Bamberg in 1996, the Order of Merit of the Federal Republic of Germany (1997) and the Bavarian Order of Merit in 2001. In 2003, he was awarded an honorary doctorate of science by the University of Newcastle. In 2010, he was given a lifetime achievement award by the North East Business Executive.

References

Publications

External links
The Herbert Loebl Archive at Newcastle University's Philip Robinson Library, Special Collections
Guide to the Herbert Loebl Collection at the Leo Baeck Institute, New York
Trauer um Dr. Herbert Loebl at Bamberger Onlinezeitung

1923 births
2013 deaths
Alumni of King's College, Newcastle
British businesspeople
British electrical engineers
Jewish emigrants from Nazi Germany to the United Kingdom
Officers of the Order of the British Empire
People educated at Dover Grammar School for Boys
People from Bamberg
Recipients of the Cross of the Order of Merit of the Federal Republic of Germany
People associated with Newcastle University